Pranzo Oltranzista is Mike Patton's second solo project. It is subtitled "Musica da Tavola per Cinque" (literally translated as Banquet Piece for Five Players), and is based on "Futurist Cookbook" by Filippo Tommaso Marinetti, written in 1932. Following the experimental Adult Themes for Voice, it contains numerous tracks linked by culinary themes and best listened to as a unitary movement. Featuring Marc Ribot on guitar, William Winant on percussion, Erik Friedlander on cello and John Zorn on alto sax, this is Patton's most technically sophisticated solo project.

Track listing 
All tracks written by Mike Patton.

Personnel
Erik Friedlander - cello
Mike Patton - voice, sound effects
Marc Ribot - guitar
William Winant - percussion
John Zorn - alto saxophone

References 

1997 albums
Mike Patton albums
Tzadik Records albums
Experimental music albums by American artists
Sound collage albums